Garuga is a genus of shrubs and trees in the family Burseraceae (the incense or torchwood family). Members are found in Asia and America.

Description
Garuga species are deciduous trees. The flowers are bisexual. The fruits are drupes (i.e. with a pit).

Distribution and habitat
Garuga species grow naturally in continental Southeast Asia, Malesia, Melanesia, northern Australia and the Solomon Islands. Their habitat is lowland forest from sea-level to  altitude.

Species
 The Plant List recognises 5 accepted taxa (of species and infraspecific names):
 Garuga floribunda  — insular SE Asia and Australia.  
 G. floribunda var. gamblei  
 Garuga forrestii  
 Garuga pierrei  - China, Indo-China
 Garuga pinnata

References

External links  
  Garuga description 

Burseraceae genera
Burseraceae